Kasiesville is an unincorporated community in Montgomery Township in Franklin County, Pennsylvania, United States. Kasiesville is located on Pennsylvania Route 75, south of Mercersburg and north of the Maryland border.

A variant name was "Camp Hill". The community was founded as "Camp Hill" circa 1830. A post office called Kasiesville was established in 1893, and remained in operation until 1905.

References

External links

Unincorporated communities in Franklin County, Pennsylvania
Unincorporated communities in Pennsylvania